José Antonio Núñez (born March 14, 1979 in Monte Cristi, Dominican Republic) is a former pitcher in Major League Baseball. He pitched in parts of the 2001 and 2002 seasons for the Los Angeles Dodgers and San Diego Padres.

External links

1979 births
Living people
Capital City Bombers players
Dominican Republic expatriate baseball players in Canada
Dominican Republic expatriate baseball players in the United States
Gulf Coast Mets players
Kingsport Mets players
Lake Elsinore Storm players

Los Angeles Dodgers players
Major League Baseball pitchers
Major League Baseball players from the Dominican Republic
Mobile BayBears players
Québec Capitales players
San Antonio Missions players
San Diego Padres players
St. Lucie Mets players